"Just Long Enough to Say Goodbye" is a song written by Bill Rice and Jerry Foster, and recorded by American country music artist Mickey Gilley.  It was released in March 1979 as the second and final single from his album The Songs We Made Love To.  The song reached number 10 on the U.S. Billboard Hot Country Singles chart and number 10 on the Canadian RPM Country Tracks chart.

Chart performance

References

Songs about parting
1978 singles
Mickey Gilley songs
Songs written by Bill Rice
Song recordings produced by Eddie Kilroy
Playboy Records singles
1978 songs
Songs written by Jerry Foster